Shanghai Circus World is a metro station on Shanghai Metro Line 1 in the former Zhabei District, now Jing'an District.

The station is named after the Shanghai Circus World, an indoor circus near the station. Other points of interest nearby include Guangzhong Park and Zhabei Stadium.

Exit list

References 

Railway stations in China opened in 2004
Shanghai Metro stations in Jing'an District
Line 1, Shanghai Metro
Railway stations in Shanghai